Archeogyaritus andrei is a species of beetle in the family Cerambycidae, and the type species of its genus. It was described by Gouverneur and Vitali in 2016.

References

Gyaritini
Beetles described in 2016